Ana Belena Fernández (born January 10, 1988 )  is a Mexican model, and later, actress of soap operas. She studied acting in  Centro de Formacion Actoral of TV Azteca in 2006.

Filmography

References

External links 

1988 births
Living people
21st-century Mexican actresses
Mexican telenovela actresses
People educated at Centro de Estudios y Formación Actoral